Harrison Leroy Gray (September 5, 1941 – August 19, 2022) was a Canadian professional ice hockey goaltender who played in the National Hockey League with the Detroit Red Wings during the 1963–64 season. The rest of his career, which lasted from 1961 to 1970, was spent in the minor leagues.

Playing career
Gray played for only 40 minutes of one NHL game, the November 28, 1963 match against the Montreal Canadiens. He received credit for the loss after allowing 5 goals on 31 shots in a 7–3 loss at Detroit. Gray took over for the injured Terry Sawchuck.

From 1964 to 1969, Gray played another 318 games in the Eastern Hockey League before retiring from professional hockey.

Prior to playing for the Detroit Red Wings, Gray played 15 games in the Western Hockey League with the Edmonton Flyers, and 3 games with the Cincinnati Wings in the Central Hockey League. Gray died in Strathmore, Alberta in 2022 at the age of 80.

Career statistics

Regular season and playoffs

See also
 List of players who played only one game in the NHL

References

External links
 

1941 births
2022 deaths
Canadian ice hockey goaltenders
Cincinnati Wings players
Detroit Red Wings players
Edmonton Flyers (WHL) players
Edmonton Oil Kings (WCHL) players
Jacksonville Rockets players
Knoxville Knights players
Ice hockey people from Calgary